Alloy is an unincorporated community in Fayette County, West Virginia, United States. Alloy was originally known as Boncar (anagram of carbon) until the mid-1930s. Both the original placename and the current placename refer to the ferroalloy plant that still operates here (producing about 30% of all the silicon metal in North America). The metals plant was originally the Electro Metallurgical Co.; a unit of Union Carbide and Carbon Corporation. Alloy has a post office with ZIP code 25002.

Gallery

References

Unincorporated communities in Fayette County, West Virginia
Unincorporated communities in West Virginia
Coal towns in West Virginia
Populated places on the Kanawha River